Karri Narayana Rao, better known as K. Narayana Rao M.A., M.L. was an Indian lawyer and parliament member. He was elected to the 4th and 5th Lok Sabha from Bobbili constituency and held the office from 1967 to 1977.

Brief life sketch
'Rao' was born at Santa Narisipuram of Srikakulam district on 1 July 1929. He has studied at Andhra University, Waltair, Madras University and Indian School of International Studies, New Delhi.

'Rao' was in Government Service (Law Commission of India) prior to entering politics; He has worked as Senior Research Officer in the Indian Law Institute, New Delhi between 1959 and 1963; as Junior Law Officer in the Law Commission, New Delhi between 1963 and 67 and as Vice-President Indian Society of International Law, New Delhi. He was Member Andhra Pradesh State Transport Authority. He was Chairman of the Committee on Offices of Profit.

External links
 Profile of K. Narayana Rao at Lok Sabha website

1929 births
2002 deaths
India MPs 1967–1970
India MPs 1971–1977
20th-century Indian lawyers
People from Srikakulam district
Lok Sabha members from Andhra Pradesh
Indian National Congress politicians from Andhra Pradesh
Andhra University alumni